Thomas Chambers Hine (31 May 1813 – 6 February 1899) was an architect based in Nottingham.

Background

He was born in Covent Garden into a prosperous middle-class family, the eldest son of Jonathan Hine (1780–1862), a hosiery manufacturer and Melicent Chambers (1778–1845). He was articled to the London architect Matthew Habershon until 1834.

In 1837 he arrived in Nottingham and formed a partnership with the builder William Patterson. This business relationship was dissolved in 1849. He worked from 1857 with Robert Evans JP until early in 1867 and thereafter with his son George Thomas Hine until his retirement around 1890.

He was nominated as a Fellow of the Royal Institute of British Architects in 1878, but this appears to have been voided.

Personal life

He married Mary Betts (1813–1893) in 1837 and together had seven children surviving to adulthood. Their eldest child, Mary Melicent Hine (1838–1928) became a nurse and founded the Nottingham Children's Hospital on Postern Street in Nottingham.

Buildings

1840s

St Laurence's Church, Gonalston rebuilding 1843
Holy Trinity Church, Shirebrook 1843-44
Monument to Lord George Frederick Cavendish Bentinck, Market Place, Mansfield, Nottinghamshire 1849
Rectory Kinoulton, Nottinghamshire, 1849
Rectory Maplebeck, Nottinghamshire, 1849

1850s

Nottingham Corn Exchange, Thurland Street, Nottingham 1849–50
Holy Cross Church, Morton Derbyshire 1850
St Paul's Church, Hasland Derbyshire 1850
Rectory at St Paul's Church, Hasland Derbyshire 1850
5, 7, 9, 11, 21, 23, Park Valley, The Park, Nottingham 1844-51
1–11 and 25 Regent Street, Nottingham 1851
Hine and Mundella, Station Street, Nottingham 1851 
1 Clifton Terrace, The Park, Nottingham 1851
Gonalston Hall, Nottinghamshire, remodelling 1851–52
South Manor for Sir Thomas Parkyns, Ruddington, Nottinghamshire 1852
Priory Church of St. Peter, Thurgarton, Nottinghamshire, restoration 1852–53
Bluecoat School, Mansfield Road, Nottingham 1852-53
Flintham Hall Nottinghamshire, remodelling and two lodges 1853
St Laurence's Church, Gonalston, Nottinghamshire, rebuilt 1853
The Park Estate, Nottingham 1854 onwards
Stanford House, Castle Gate, Nottingham 1854
Hosiery Warehouse (Topshop in 2016), corner of Low Pavement and Lister Gate, Nottingham 1854
Nottingham General Hospital addition of third storey and chapel 1854–55
The Park Tunnel, Nottingham 1855 
Lace Warehouses for Richard Birkin, Broadway, Nottingham 1855
Lace Warehouse for Thomas Adams, Stoney Street, Nottingham 1855
St Giles' Church, Darlton, Nottinghamshire, restoration 1855
St. George's Church, Barton in Fabis, Nottinghamshire, restoration 1855
Elton and Orston railway station, Great Northern Railway, Nottinghamshire 1855
Christ Church, Cinderhill, Nottingham 1856
Warehouse, 16 Pilcher Gate, Nottingham 1856
1, 3, 5, 7, 9, 11, 13, 29, 31, 33 Newcastle Drive, The Park, Nottingham 1856-59
Radcliffe railway station, Great Northern Railway, Nottinghamshire 1857?
Aslockton railway station, Great Northern Railway, Nottinghamshire 1857
Bingham railway station, Great Northern Railway, Nottinghamshire 1857
Nottingham Great Northern railway station, 1857
Corn Warehouse, Great Northern Railway, London Road, Nottingham 1857
All Saints Church, Broxholme, Lincolnshire, 1857
1–6 Castle Grove, The Park, Nottingham 1856-58
Coppice Hospital, Ransom Road, Mapperley, Nottingham 1857–59
William House, 1 South Road, The Park, Nottingham 1859

1860s

St Michael's Church, Farnsfield, Nottinghamshire, rebuilding 1859–60
St Michael the Archangel's Church, Laxton, Nottinghamshire, restoration 1859–60
School, Farnsfield, Nottinghamshire, 1859–60
10–12 Plumptre Street, Nottingham 1861
13–33 Lenton Road, The Park, Nottingham 1858–62
St Oswald's Church, Dunham-on-Trent, Nottinghamshire, and vicarage 1861–62
St. Luke's Church, Shireoaks, Nottinghamshire 1861–62
Lenton Firs, Derby Road, University of Nottingham 1862 (remodelled)
Cranfield Court, Bedfordshire, 1862–64
 HM Prison Foston Hall, 1863
All Saints' Church, Nottingham, 1863–64
Meadows Mill, Queen's Road, Nottingham 1865
Nottingham High School, Arboretum Street, Nottingham, with Thomas Simpson, 1866–67
St. Peter's Church, Aisthorpe, Lincolnshire, 1867
St. Matthias Church, St. Matthias Street, Sneinton, Nottingham 1867–69
Old Rectory, Beelsby, Lincolnshire, 1868
St. Stephen's Church, Bunker's Hill enlargement 1868

1870s

Convent of the Sisters of St. Joseph, Mapperley Road, Mapperley, Nottingham 1870
Simla Villa, 73 Raleigh Street, Nottingham 1870
St. Michael's Church, Coningsby, Lincolnshire, restoration 1870
St. Giles Church, West Bridgford, Nottinghamshire, restoration 1872
Claremont, 7 North Road, The Park, Nottingham 1872
Vicarage, Beckingham, Nottinghamshire, 1873
St. Margaret's Church, Bilsthorpe, restoration and addition of Savile transeptal chapel 1873
Vicarage, Edwinstowe, Nottinghamshire, alterations 1874
Linden House, Newcastle Circus, The Park, Nottingham 1875
6 Maxtoke Road, The Park, Nottingham 1875
Nottingham Castle Museum of Fine Art, 1875-78
All Saints Church, Ordsall, Nottinghamshire, restoration 1876
1 Cavendish Crescent South, The Park, Nottingham 1877
Mevell House, 7 Newcastle Circus, The Park, Nottingham 1877
Shire Hall, High Pavement, Nottingham, extensions and alterations 1876–79
Penrhyn House, Tunnel Road, The Park, Nottingham 1879

1880s

St. Edmund's Church, Holme Pierrepont, Nottinghamshire, alterations 1878–81
18-20 Park Terrace, The Park, Nottingham 1881
Cavendish House, Cavendish Road East, The Park, Nottingham 1881
Overdale, Cavendish Road East, The Park, Nottingham 1883
Elmhurst, Cavendish Road East, The Park, Nottingham 1883
Cavendish Court, 25 Cavendish Road East, The Park, Nottingham 1884-85
County Junior School, Lovers Lane, Newark-on-Trent 1889

References

  Photographs of many of T.C. Hine's surviving buildings can be found under the 'Buildings' section of the Nottingham21 Web Site
 Nottingham Hidden History Team page about Thomas Chambers Hine Retrieved 26 July 2013
 

1814 births
1899 deaths
19th-century English architects
People from Covent Garden
Architects from Nottingham